Hunkeler macht Sachen is a 2008 Swiss German language television film that was filmed and produced at locations in Switzerland and in France. It is the third film in the hexalogy starring Mathias Gnädinger as Swiss police detective Peter Hunkeler.

Cast 

 Mathias Gnädinger as Kommissär Peter Hunkeler
 Charlotte Heinimann as Hedwig 
 Oliver Tobias as Thomas Garzoni 
 Hanspeter Müller-Drossart as Wirt Edi
 Gilles Tschudi as Madörin 
 Jürg Löw as Staatsanwalt Suter 
 Marc Schmassmann as Assistant Lüdi 
 Emanuela von Frankenberg as Gerichtsmedizinerin Anne de Ville
 Andrea Gloggner   
 Peter Jecklin 
 Ueli Jäggi 
 Diana Rojas-Feile as Angel 
 Doris Paladini as Barbara Amsler

Plot (excerpt)  
A prostitute with slashed earlobes is found strangled in a pond. Later, Kommissär Hunkeler (Mathias Gnädinger) finds his sidekick Schirmer also murdered with slashed earlobes, however, he gradually begins to doubt his abilities, and later even he's suspended by his boss Staatsanwalt Suter. Thomas Gazoni, owner of a brothel and Marlene Mauch’s lover, Schirmer’s former girlfriend, is strongly suspected. As he tells to Hunkeler whose help he's asking, Gazoni (Oliver Tobias) is troubled by his past as a member of the Fahrende minority in Switzerland, and even was a ward of the Kinder der Landstrasse organisation in the 1970s. Although the Basel Police's younger colleague Madörin (Gilles Tschudi) is treating the "Schirmer case" as a murder involving drugs, Hunkeler is of another opinion, ...

Background 
The hexalogy was produced for Swiss television SF DRS between 2004 (Das Paar im Kahn) and 2012 (Hunkeler und die Augen des Ödipus). This third instalment is based on the 2004 novel Hunkeler macht Sachen by Hansjörg Schneider.

Production

Locations 
The production of the Swiss television SRF was filmed at locations in Basel, in the Canton of Basel-Land and in Alsace in France. The film director also produced Das Paar im Kahn in 2004.

Kommissär Hunkeler 
Hunkeler has unconventional methods, and has a lot of compassion for ordinary people, for society's little guys. These facts, as well as his at times gruff conduct bring him into conflict with colleagues and superiors. On occasion, Basel police want to get rid of him because Hunkeler often does not adhere to the rules. 
As the film director of the first Hunkeler film loves "fat detectives", Marie-Louise Bless searched for an actor who was "fat, charismatic, and could credibly embody an advocate for the little guy". Mathias Gnädinger was the ideal choice ("Gnädinger is Hunkeler is Gnädinger"), a view also shared by the author of the novel, Hans Jörg Schneider. Mathias Gnädinger, in his early years a stage actor at the Theater Neumarkt at Neumarkt, Zürich, died on 3 April 2015, hence the Hunkeler serial comprises six films in all.

Kinder der Landstrasse 
The film refers to the Swiss Kinder der Landstrasse relief organization and the fate of those juvenile Fahrende victims.

So in a short scene, the keeper of the archives handles over to Hunkeler among other documents a film, Kinder der Landstrasse, in which Mathias Gnädinger starred in 1993 as actor.

Reception 
Hunkeler macht Sachen premiered at 14e Cinéma tout écran at Geneva in Switzerland in October 2008 and at the 44th Solothurn Film Festival in January 2009. The film was repeatedly broadcast in the Swiss television, for the last time on 17 May 2015 on SRF 1. Hunkeler macht Sachen is available on DVD in a Swiss German language version with German subtitles.

Festivals 
 2008: 14e Cinéma tout écran - Festival international du film et de la télévision at Geneva.
 2009: Solothurn Film Festival.

References

External links 
 

2000s crime films
2008 television films
2008 films
Films shot in France
Films shot in Switzerland
German-language television shows
Hexalogies
Swiss German-language films
Swiss television films
Yenish people